"Stuck" is a song by American singer-songwriter Stacie Orrico, released in February 2003. It can be found on her self-titled second album. It was used in the Disney Channel Original Movie Stuck in the Suburbs. The song was released in the United States on February 3, 2003.

"Stuck" was a chart success worldwide. The single peaked at  52 in the US while reaching No. 3 in Australia, the Netherlands, and New Zealand. It additionally peaked at No. 9 in the United Kingdom and became a top-10 hit in several other European countries. The music video was directed by Diane Martel. The video shows her on and off relationship with her boyfriend during high school.

Music video
The music video was filmed in early 2003 and was directed by Diane Martel. The video stars Orrico's cousin, actor Trevor Wright.

The video begins with Orrico's alarm clock waking her up and after she turns it off, she looks at a framed picture of her and her boyfriend (Trevor Wright), frowns at it and turns it over, letting it drop behind the nightstand as she puts her head back on her pillow. She gets out of her bed and walks to her mirror which is covered with pictures of her boyfriend, she then writes the word "stuck" in red lipstick on the mirror. She then gets on a school bus and sits in her seat, clearly in a bad mood. She then notices that her boyfriend is on the bus driving by and he waves to her and is blowing kisses to her. Orrico slides down her seat, using a notebook to block her view of him. Later, she stands in front of a chain-link fence and watches him play basketball with his friends. Another scene shows Orrico getting ready for a school dance, but when she arrives, she sees her boyfriend dancing with another girl and then leaves, just as her boyfriend notices her. When she gets off the bus, she quickly walks over to her boyfriend. Just as they approach each other, she walks away from him.

Track listings
US CD single
 "Stuck" (album version) – 3:42
 "Stuck" (rhythmic mix) – 3:46
 "Stuck" (Thunderpuss radio version) – 3:04
 "More To Life" (snippet) – 0:57
 "I Promise" (snippet) – 0:58

UK CD single
 "Stuck" (album version) – 3:42
 "Stuck" (Barry Harris & Chris Cox club remix) – 8:25
 "Until I Find You" – 3:01
 "Stuck" (video)

European CD single
 "Stuck" (album version) – 3:42
 "Bounce Back" – 3:01

US CD Maxi
 "Stuck" (album version) – 3:42
 "Stuck" (rhythmic mix) – 3:46
 "Stuck" (Thunderpuss radio version) – 3:04
 "More To Life" (snippet) – 0:57
 "I Promise" (snippet) – 0:58
 "Stuck" (video) – 3:55

12-inch maxi
 "Stuck" (Barry Harris & Chris Cox club remix) – 8:25
 "Stuck" (Barry Harris & Chris Cox radio remix) – 3:05
 "Stuck" (Barry Harris & Chris Cox dub) – 10:05
 "Stuck" (rhythmic mix) – 3:45

Charts

Weekly charts

Year-end charts

Certifications

Release history

References

2003 singles
Stacie Orrico songs
Music videos directed by Diane Martel
Song recordings produced by Matt Serletic
2003 songs
ForeFront Records singles
Virgin Records singles
Songs written by Kevin Kadish
Songs written by Stacie Orrico
Song recordings produced by Dallas Austin